Brandimarte is an Italian surname. Notable people with the surname include: 

 Alfeo Brandimarte (1906–1944), Italian naval officer and resistance member
 Benedetto Brandimarte, 16th-century Italian painter

See also
 Brandimarte 
 Brandimarte Tommasi (1591–1648), Italian Roman Catholic prelate

Italian-language surnames